Holy Trinity Church, Lenton is a parish church in the Church of England Diocese of Southwell.

The church is Grade II* listed by the Department for Digital, Culture, Media and Sport as it is a particularly significant building of more than local interest.

History

Holy Trinity was designed by the architect Henry Isaac Stevens and opened in 1842.  It was consecrated on 6 October 1842 by  the Lord Bishop of Lincoln (the Right Reverend John Jackson D.D.).

The architectural style is early English. Built in stone with a high pitched roof, it consists of a nave with clerestory, aisles to north and south, a chancel, vestry, organ-chamber, and a west end pinnacled tower. The chancel screen was designed by John Rigby Poyser and installed in 1935.

Its dimensions are 123 feet long and 57 feet wide. When opened it had seating for 660 people.

Features

Holy Trinity is famous for its twelfth century font which was originally built for Lenton Priory and was given to the church by Severus William Lynam Stretton in 1842.

Memorials
Albert Ball on the north wall. Captain in the Royal Flying Corps who was awarded the Victoria Cross.

List of incumbents

George Brown MA 1840 - 1886
Percy Edward Smith MA 1886 - 1893 
Allan Hunter Watts 1893 - 1917
Felix Asher BD 1917 - 1922 
W. Aden Wright 1922 - 1928
Rainald J.R. Skipper, CF, 1929 - 1954 (died in the pulpit of Holy Trinity Church, Trinity Square)
G. Hill (killed in a bicycle accident)
R. P. Neil MA, 1957 - 1962
L. L. Abbott, 1963 - 1967
R. G. Dunford, 1967 - 1980
David Williams MA, 1981 - 1987
Lloyd Scott, 1989 - 2003
W, Robert Lovatt MA, 1994 - 2004
Martin Kirkbride, 2005 - 2011
Megan Smith, 2012 - 2021
Garreth Frank, 2022 -

Clock and bells

An eight-day church clock was built in 1844 by Samuel Holland of Barker Gate, Nottingham. It was 3 ft 4in wide and 3 ft 6in high, with a dead beat escapement.

The tower has a set of eight bells. The church was originally only provided with one bell, but five more were added in 1856. In 1902, two more bells were added, given by the brothers Frederick Ball and Albert Ball. The latter was the father of the First War War ace Albert Ball.

Organ

The organ was built by Messrs. Bevington and Sons, and was opened on 22 October 1846, and was moved and enlarged by Charles Lloyd in 1870. A new organ by Brindley & Foster replaced this and was opened on 31 May 1906 at evensong with a recital by F.E. Hollingshead, organist of St Andrew's Church, Bath.

Organists
Mrs. Cooper 1846 - 
Francis Marshall Ward 1865 - 1867
Charles Rogers 1867 - ???? (formerly organist of St Mark's Church, Nottingham)
Fred Harvey 1883 - 1919
Vernon Sydney Read 1919 – 1922 (afterwards organist of St. Mary's Church, Nottingham)
Charles Pickard 1924 - 1951 (Formerly organist of Hucknall Parish Church. Afterwards organist St. Andrew's Church, Nottingham)
W. Harry Bland 1951 - 1982 ?

References

Sources
The Buildings of England, Nottinghamshire. Nikolaus Pevsner

External links

See Holy Trinity Church on Google Street View

Lenton, Holy Trinity Church
Lenton, Holy Trinity Church
Churches completed in 1842
19th-century Church of England church buildings
Lenton, Holy Trinity Church